Ioscion morgani is an extinct prehistoric bony fish that lived during the Upper Miocene subepoch of what is now Southern California.  It is primarily known from incomplete fossils, such as the holotype, which consists of a broken backbone.  Although the head is unknown, enough of the animal's anatomy suggests a relationship with the jackfishes of Carangidae.

See also

 Prehistoric fish
 List of prehistoric bony fish

References

Prehistoric perciform genera
Miocene fish
Neogene animals of North America